William Deans Cowan (1844, Newbattle -1924) was a Scottish naturalist. He was a member of  the  London Missionary Society who was sent to Madagascar (1874-1881), where he taught Malagasy students at Fianarantsoa.He was an authorities collector of natural history material including lemurs, birds, reptiles, molluscs and insects that were sent to the zoology department of the British Museum (Natural History) under Albert Günther (a total of 13,000-14,000 specimens). 

Much of his plant collection, is also held by that institutions herbarium then under William Carruthers.He also collected insects for John Obadiah Westwood, birds for Alfred Newton and orchids for Henry Nicholas Ridley
 
He was a Member of the Royal Geographic Society.

Publications
The Stone Elephant at Ambohisary. Antananarivo Annual 1878.
The Tanala Country and People 1881.
The Bara Land A description of the country and people LMS Press, Antananarivo 1881.""the land has been spied out; mountains are placed where they ought to be; rivers and villages are named with their proper names. The whole country is now mapped out, and all the guess geography of its past cleared up Cowan
List of Madagascar birds, together with the native names among a few of the different tribes.Friends’ Foreign Mission Association  Antananariv, 1881.Madagascar — List  of  Ferns  and  other Cryptogamae,  shewing  their  relation  to  Mauritius  and  Bourbon [London]  (1881.) 8vo. Geographical Excursions In South Central Madagascar.London: Royal Geographical Society, 1882 which includes accounts of native tribes.SOAS digital collections
Notes on the Natural History of Madagascar Proceedings of the Royal Physical Society of Edinburgh 1882

Species named for him include Mantidactylus cowanii (Boulenger, 1882)
 Cowan's shrew tenrec Microgale cowani Thomas, 1882 Charaxes cowani Butler, 1878
 Cowan's mantella Mantella cowanii Boulenger, 1882Pygora cowani Waterhouse, 1878 Riparia paludicola cowani (Sharpe, 1882)  London.Jumellea cowanii (Ridley, 1885)
Cowan's giant fire millipede - Aphistogoniulus cowani'' (Butler, 1882)

Tributes
Charles Price another  missionary wrote of him "Naturalists are born not made.. .But Cowan was both born and made one. He has always had an instinctive love of hunting out birds' nests, watching the habits of animals, seeking their lairs, and making himself one with them, so that he would think nothing of carrying a few snakes in his pocket, a dozen beetles or so in his hat, and a frog or lizard carefully tied up in his best handkerchief."

Arthur G. Butler wrote "The Lepidoptera here enumerated [On a Collection of Lepidoptera recently received from Madagascar. By Arthur G. Butler, F.L.S., F.Z.S.] were collected by the Rev. William Dean Cowan. The series of butterflies in the collection represents rather less than one third of those hitherto recorded as occurring in Madagascar  and, owing to the careful manner in which Mr. Cowan has recorded upon each envelope all facts known to him respecting the species therein contained, not a little information respecting the habits and distribution of the Mascarene forms has been gained."

"The greater part of the plants herein described were collected by the Rev. Wm. Deans Cowan in the east and centre f the island during the past few years. Mr. Cowan's attention, among plants,
was especially directed to the Orchideae, of which, besides dried and spirit-specimens, he has brought home a good collection of coloured drawings, of no small value in a group of plants so difficult to preserve as Orchideae. In addition to these plants, I have added notes or descriptions of interesting plants from the collections of the late J. M. Hildebrandt, and of Hilsenberg and Bojer.All the plants, except where otherwise stated, are in the herbarium of the British Museum at South Kensington".Ridley, H. N. (1883). Descriptions and Notes on new or rare Monocotyledonous Plants from Madagascar

See also
James Sibree
Richard Baron
Wildlife of Madagascar

References

Global plants

External links
 Collection of Madagascar orchid drawings includes iconotypes
Johan Hermans , Simon Verlynde, Landy Rajaovelona, Phillip J. Cribb  & Jean-Michel Hervouet , 2020 New species and nomenclatural changes in Angraecum (Orchidaceae  Kew Bulletin (2020) 75: 49 DOI 10.1007/S12225-020-09902-7

1844 births
1924 deaths
Scottish zoologists